Toni Jerrman (born 1964) is critic and editor of the Finnish sci-fi magazine Tähtivaeltaja. He founded the Tähtivaeltaja and Tähtifantasia Awards.  

He has won several awards, including:

 The Arctic Comic Festival's Publication-Lempi for Tähtivaeltaja (1998)
 Dark Fantasy's Golden Chainsaw for the best horror print (short story anthology Himon anatomia, edited by Jerrman) (1998)
 The Finnish Science Fiction Writers Association's Cosmos Pen reward for promoting Finnish sci-fi literature (1992)
 European Science Fiction Society's European Science Fiction Award: Best chief editor (1988)

See also
 Fanzine
 Science fiction fandom

References

External links
 The official Tähtivaeltaja site
 Jeff VanderMeer: Dispatches From Smaragdine. SF Site, November 2006.
 Jeff VanderMeer Interviews Toni Jerrman. The SF Signal 5/2011.

Living people
1964 births
Finnish journalists
Science fiction editors
Finnish literary critics
Finnish film critics
Finnish speculative fiction editors
Finnish speculative fiction critics